Shurestan (also Romanized as Shūrestān) is a village in Zavin Rural District, Zavin District, Kalat County, Razavi Khorasan Province, Iran. At the 2006 census, its population was 484, in 105 families.

References 

Populated places in Kalat County